Frances Wilson Grayson (c. 1892 – c. December 23, 1927) was an American woman who disappeared flying to Newfoundland just before her attempt to cross the Atlantic Ocean. She was a niece of President Woodrow Wilson.

Biography
Grayson was born as Frances Wilson in Cherokee Village, Arkansas, to Andrew Jackson "A.J." Wilson and Minnie M. Lewis. She had two brothers: Walter M. Wilson later became a grocer in Muncie, Indiana. The other, Roscoe Jesse "Jack" Wilson died young (before 1924). In 1896, the family moved from Arkansas to Indiana, where she graduated from Muncie High School in Muncie. She next attended the Chicago Musical College in Chicago, Illinois. Her plan was to accompany her brother "Jack", who planned to be a professional singer. When her brother died she stopped studying music. She then attended Swarthmore College in Swarthmore, Pennsylvania, for recitation and dramatic arts.

At Swarthmore College, she met John Brady Grayson, and they married on September 15, 1914. They divorced with no children after nine years. Frances Grayson then moved to Manhattan, New York City, where she was a writer for a newspaper. She then became a real estate agent.

While in Manhattan, Grayson became interested in aviation and in the idea of making a flight across the Atlantic Ocean. She bought a new Sikorsky S-36 amphibian plane, which she named Dawn, and received financing for the flight from Mrs. Aage Ancker. She recruited Royal Norwegian Navy Lieutenant Oskar Omdal to serve as the aircraft's pilot, Brice Goldsborough as its navigator, and Frank Koehler as its radio engineer. They made plans to begin the transatlantic flight from the Dominion of Newfoundland. Omdal was to fly the plane across the Atlantic, although Grayson may have planned to perform some of the flying herself.

Disappearance
The four took off from Curtiss Field on Long Island, New York, on the evening of December 23, 1927, bound for Harbor Grace in Newfoundland. They radioed that something was wrong later in the evening and never reached Newfoundland; their remains were never found. Their plane probably went down in the Atlantic off Nova Scotia during a storm. Grayson was 35 years old at the time of her death.

Legacy
In 1928, the Ontario Surveyor General named a number of lakes in the northwest of the province to honour aviators who had perished during 1927, mainly in attempting oceanic flights. These include Goldsborough Lake, Grayson Lake and Omdahl  Lake which are in close proximity to each other in the Wabakimi Provincial Park.

See also
Elsie Mackay, missing female aviator
Amelia Earhart, missing female aviator
Amy Johnson, missing female aviator
List of missing aircraft
List of people who disappeared mysteriously at sea

References

Further reading
 The New York Times, December 26, 1927, page 1; "Grayson Plane Radioed 'Something Wrong' Friday Night; Then the Signaling Ceased, Silent for 54 Hours Since; Probably Lost Off The Nova Scotia Coast in a Storm."
 The Frederick Post; Frederick, Maryland; December 28, 1927; Hope Dwindiling in Plane Search

External links
 Bernice Walker's Photo Album, 1928.
 Gallery of History: Photograph.
 University of Houston: Frances Wilson Grayson.

1890s births
1920s missing person cases
1927 deaths
Missing aviators
Missing person cases in Canada
People from Fulton County, Arkansas
People lost at sea
Swarthmore College alumni
Victims of aviation accidents or incidents in 1927
Victims of aviation accidents or incidents in Canada
Year of birth uncertain
American women aviators